NGC 353 is a spiral galaxy in the constellation Cetus. It was discovered on November 10, 1885 by Lewis Swift. It was described by Dreyer as "extremely faint, pretty small, round, southeastern of 2.", the other being NGC 351.

References

External links
 

0353
18851110
Cetus (constellation)
Barred spiral galaxies
003714